The 1935 International University Games were organised by the Confederation Internationale des Etudiants (CIE) and held in Budapest, Hungary. Held from 10–18 August, a total of 774 athletes from 26 nations competed in a programme featuring ten sports. Gymnastics made its first appearance on the programme, with events for men and women.

Sports

Athletics medal summary

Men

Women

Athletics medal table

Participating nations

References
World Student Games (Pre-Universiade) - GBR Athletics 

Summer World University Games
Athletics at the Summer Universiade
International University Games
International University Games
International University Games
International sports competitions in Budapest
International athletics competitions hosted by Hungary
1930s in Budapest
August 1935 sports events